Aladzhov, Aladjov, female form Aladzhova, Aladjova  is a Bulgarian surname. Notable people with the surname include:

Stefan Aladzhov (born 1947), Bulgarian footballer
Katrin Aladjova (born 1971), Bulgarian-Australian chess player

Bulgarian-language surnames